The finals and the qualifying heats of the women's 400 metre individual medley event at the 1998 World Aquatics Championships were held on Monday 12 January 1998 in Perth, Western Australia.

A Final

B Final

Qualifying heats

See also
1996 Women's Olympic Games 400m Individual Medley (Atlanta)
1997 Women's World SC Championships 400m Individual Medley (Gothenburg)
1997 Women's European LC Championships 400m Individual Medley (Seville)
2000 Women's Olympic Games 400m Individual Medley (Sydney)

References

Swimming at the 1998 World Aquatics Championships
1998 in women's swimming